Magnus Andersson (born 29 July 1967) is a retired Swedish football midfielder.

References

1967 births
Living people
Swedish footballers
IFK Trelleborg players
Trelleborgs FF players
Association football midfielders
Allsvenskan players